Actinopus ipioca is a species of mygalomorph spider in the family Actinopodidae. It can be found in Brazil.

The specific name ipioca refers to the Ipioca Beach in Maceió, Alagoas, Brazil.

References 

ipioca
Spiders described in 2020
Spiders of Brazil